Storefronts Seattle, under the auspices of arts non-profit Shunpike, selects artists by way of empaneled jury to create artworks in underutilized commercial space in Seattle.  Past artists include Paul Komada, Paul Kuniholm, John Grade and Donald Byrd.

References

 https://locate.publicartarchive.org/art/But-If-You-Try-Sometimes-You-Get-What-You-Need?ib=ext
 https://locate.publicartarchive.org/art/Sculpture-Intervention-ArtWear?ib=ext

2010 establishments in Washington (state)
Culture of Seattle